The Ronald Reagan Highway or Ronald Reagan Memorial Highway may refer to the following roads named after U.S. President Ronald Reagan:

Ronald Reagan Highway
 U.S. Route 14 in Illinois
 Interstate 25 in Colorado in El Paso County
 Interstate 275 (Ohio–Indiana–Kentucky) in Kentucky

Ronald Reagan Memorial Highway
 Interstate 65 in Alabama between Birmingham and Decatur
 Interstate 20 in Texas, near Arlington, Texas
 U.S. Route 190 in Louisiana

Other highways named after Ronald Reagan
 Ronald Reagan Memorial Tollway, the tolled portion of Interstate 88 in Illinois
 Ronald Reagan Cross County Highway in Cincinnati, Ohio, a portion of Ohio State Route 126
 Interstate 469 in Indiana, also known as the Ronald Reagan Expressway
 California State Route 118, also known as the Ronald Reagan Freeway
 Florida's Turnpike, also known as the Ronald Reagan Turnpike
 Ronald Reagan Parkway in Gwinnett County, Georgia
 Ronald Reagan Trail in Illinois